Sestakovaia is a small genus of liocranid sac spiders first described by Alireza Zamani and Yuri M. Marusik in 2021.  it contains only two species: S. annulipes and S. hyrcania. This genus is named after the Slovakian arachnologist Anna Šestáková.

See also
 Mesiotelus
 Liocranum
 List of Liocranidae species

References

Further reading

Liocranidae genera
Palearctic spiders